Perenniporia is a cosmopolitan genus of bracket-forming or crust-like polypores in the family Polyporaceae. They are dimitic or trimitic with smooth, thick-walled basidiospores and cause a white rot in affected wood.

Taxonomy
Perenniporia was proposed by American mycologist William Alphonso Murrill in 1943 to contain two species formerly placed in Poria, a genus formerly used to contain all crust-like poroid fungi. His description of the genus was: "Hymenophore become perennial, riding; context white or yellow; tubes pinkish, white or yellow, stratose in older specimens; spores hyaline." Murrill's concept was to move the species with annual fruit bodies (Poria unita and Poria nigriscens) into Perenniporia, retaining Poria for those that produced perennial fruit bodies.  The genus name combines the Latin word perennis ("perennial") with the genus name Poria Edalat.

Murrill's designated type species, P. unita, had a broad and poorly defined species concept that included other species, including Perenniporia medulla-panis. Additionally,  P. unita was discovered to be a nomen dubium, which also threatened the validity of the genus Perenniporia. To remedy this nomenclatural instability, Cony Decock and Joost Stalpers proposed to conserve Perenniporiella with P. medulla-panis as the type.

Although Truncospora has traditionally been considered a synonym of Perenniporia, molecular phylogenetic analysis shows that it is genetically unique and worthy of recognition as a distinct genus. Genera that have been segregated from Perenniporia include Perenniporiopsis and Perenniporiella.

Species

A 2008 estimate placed 60 species in the genus. , Index Fungorum accepts 100 species of Perenniporia:
P. abyssinica  Decock & Bitew (2012)
P. adnata Corner (1989)
P. africana Ipulet & Ryvarden (2005)
P. albocinnamomea Corner (1989)
P. alboferruginea Decock (2011)
P. alboincarnata (Pat. & Gaillard) Decock & Ryvarden (2011)
P. amazonica M.A.De Jesus & Ryvarden (2010)
P. amylodextrinoidea Gilb. & Ryvarden (1987)
P. aridula B.K.Cui & C.L.Zhao (2012)
P. aurantiaca (A.David & Rajchenb.) Decock & Ryvarden (1999)
P. bambusicola Choeyklin, T.Hatt. & E.B.G.Jones (2009)
P. bannaensis B.K.Cui & C.L.Zhao (2014)
P. bartholomei (Peck) Gibertoni & Bernicchia (2006)
P. brasiliensis C.R.S.de Lira, A.M.S.Soares, Ryvarden & Gibertoni (2017)
P. centrali-africana Decock & Mossebo (2002)
P. chiangraiensis F.Wu & X.H.Ji (2017)
P. chromatica (Berk. & Cooke) Decock & Ryvarden (1999)
P. cinereofusca B.K.Cui & C.L.Zhao (2014)
P. compacta Ryvarden & Gilb. (1984)
P. contraria (Berk. & M.A.Curtis) Ryvarden (1972)
P. cremeopora Decock & Ryvarden (2000)
P. cunninghami Decock, P.K.Buchanan & Ryvarden (2000)
P. cystidiata Y.C.Dai, W.N.Chou & Sheng H.Wu (2002)
P. decurrata  Corner (1989)
P. delavayi (Pat.) Decock & Ryvarden (1999)
P. dendrohyphidia Ryvarden (1988)
P. dipterocarpicola T.Hatt. & S.S.Lee (1999)
P. djaensis Decock & Mossebo (2002)
P. duplexa Ryvarden (2016)
P. ellipsospora Ryvarden & Gilb. (1984)
P. ellisiana (F.W.Anderson) Gilb. & Ryvarden (1985)
P. fergusii Gilb. & Ryvarden (1987)
P. ferruginea Corner (1989)
P. formosana T.T.Chang (1994)
P. fraxinea (Bull.) Ryvarden (1978)
P. fraxinophila (Peck) Ryvarden (1972)
P. fulviseda (Bres.) Dhanda (1981)
P. ganodermoides Ryvarden, Gomes-Silva & Gibertoni (2016)
P. globispora Ipulet & Ryvarden (2005)
P. gomezii Rajchenb. & J.E.Wright (1982)
P. guyanensis Decock & Ryvarden (2011)
P. hainaniana B.K.Cui & C.L.Zhao (2013)
P. hattorii Y.C.Dai & B.K.Cui (2011)
P. hexagonoides T.Hatt. & S.S.Lee (1999)
P. inflexibilis (Berk.) Ryvarden (1972)
P. isabellina (Pat.) Ryvarden (1983)
P. japonica (Yasuda) T.Hatt. & Ryvarden (1994)
P. kilemariensis Spirin & Shirokov (2005)
P. koreana Y.Jang & J.J.Kim (2015) – South Korea
P. lacerata B.K.Cui & C.L.Zhao (2013)
P. luteola B.K.Cui & C.L.Zhao (2013)
P. maackiae (Bondartsev & Ljub.) Parmasto (1995)
P. macropora B.K.Cui & C.L.Zhao (2013)
P. malvena (Lloyd) Ryvarden (1989)
P. martia (Berk.) Ryvarden (1972)
P. medulla-panis (Jacq.) Donk (1967)
P. meridionalis Decock & Stalpers (2006)
P. mesoleuca (Petch) Ryvarden (1972)
P. minor Y.C.Dai & H.X.Xiong (2008)
P. minutissima (Yasuda) T.Hatt. & Ryvarden (1994)
P. minutopora Ryvarden & Decock (2000)
P. mundula (Wakef.) Ryvarden (1972)
P. nanjenshana T.T.Chang & W.N.Chou (2000)
P. nanlingensis B.K.Cui & C.L.Zhao (2012)
P. nonggangensis F.C.Huang & Bin Liu (2017)
P. nouraguensis Decock (2016)
P. ochroleuca (Berk.) Ryvarden (1972)
P. ohiensis (Berk.) Ryvarden (1972)
P. oviformis G.Cunn. ex P.K.Buchanan & Ryvarden (1988)
P. paraguyanensis C.R.S.de Lira & Gibertoni (2017)
P. parvispora Decock & Ryvarden (2000)
P. pauciskeletalis Rajchenb. (1988)
P. penangiana Corner (1989)
P. permacilenta (Corner) T.Hatt. (2003)
P. phloiophila Gilb. & M.Blackw. (1984)
P. piceicola Y.C.Dai (2002)
P. piperis (Rick) Rajchenb. (1987)
P. podocarpi P.K.Buchanan & I.A.Hood (1992)
P. puerensis C.L.Zhao (2017) – China
P. pyricola Y.C.Dai & B.K.Cui (2010)
P. rhizomorpha B.K.Cui, Y.C.Dai & Decock (2007)
P. roseoisabellina (Pat. & Gaillard) Ryvarden (1983)
P. rosmarini A.David & Malençon (1979)
P. rufidochmia (Corner) T.Hatt. & Sotome (2013)
P. russeimarginata B.K.Cui & C.L.Zhao (2013)
P. semistipitata (Lloyd) Gilb. & Ryvarden (1987)
P. sinuosa Ryvarden (1987)
P. sprucei Decock & Ryvarden (1999)
P. stipitata Ryvarden (1987) – Brazil
P. straminella (Bres.) Ryvarden (1988)
P. subacida (Peck) Donk (1967)
P. subannosa (Bres.) Decock, S.Herrera & Ryvarden (2001)
P. subdendrohyphidia Decock (2001)
P. subovoidea Decock & Ryvarden (2013)
P. substraminea B.K.Cui & C.L.Zhao (2014)
P. subtephropora B.K.Cui & C.L.Zhao (2013)
P. tenuis (Schwein.) Ryvarden (1973)
P. tianmuensis B.K.Cui & C.L.Zhao (2013)
P. tibetica B.K.Cui & C.L.Zhao (2012)
P. truncata (Lloyd) Ryvarden (1972)
P. truncatospora (Lloyd) Ryvarden (1986)
P. vanhullii Decock & Ryvarden (2015)
P. variegata Ryvarden & Gilb. 1984)
P. voeltzkowii (Henn.) Ryvarden 1980)
P. xantha Decock & Ryvarden 1999)

References

 
Polyporales genera
Taxa named by William Alphonso Murrill
Taxa described in 1942